South Manokwari Regency is a regency of West Papua Province of Indonesia. It was formed in 2013 from the southern districts of Manokwari Regency. The population of the area now comprised in the new regency was 18,564 at the 2010 Census, which rose to 35,949 at the 2020 Census. The administrative centre is the town of Ransiki.

Geography
The geographical location of South Manokwari Regency can be seen according to its part as follows:
North : 1º5' South Latitude;
Southern Part : 2º5' South Latitude;
West : 133º45' East Longitude; and
East: 134º25' East Longitude.

Administration
South Manokwari Regency is divided into six districts (distrik), listed below with their areas and their populations at the 2010 Census and the 2020 Census. The table also includes the location of the district administrative centres, the number of administrative villages (rural desa and urban kelurahan) in each district and its post code.

References

External links
Statistics publications from Statistics Indonesia (BPS)

Regencies of West Papua (province)